Suzanne Aspden is professor of music at Jesus College, University of Oxford. She was formerly a research fellow at Robinson College, University of Cambridge from 1999 to 2002 and a lecturer in music at the University of Southampton from 2002 to 2005. In 2002-3 she was the first John Marshall and Marie Louise Osborn Fellow at the Beinecke Library, Yale University.

Selected publications
 The Rival Sirens: Performance and Identity on Handel’s Operatic Stage. Cambridge University Press, Cambridge, 2013.

References

External links
Official website

Living people
Year of birth missing (living people)
Fellows of Jesus College, Oxford
Victoria University of Wellington alumni
Alumni of the University of Oxford
Women musicologists
Historians of opera